West-Terschelling is the largest village on Terschelling in the province Friesland, the Netherlands. It had a population of around 2,602 in January 2017.

The skyline of the village is dominated by the Brandaris lighthouse, the village had also been named Sint Brandariusparochie, Sint-Brandariuskerke and just Brandaris in earlier centuries.

History
The town was partially burned on the order of Sir Robert Holmes in 1666, during the Second Anglo-Dutch War, in an event referred to as "Holmes's Bonfire".

A pub was named after the Oka 18, a ship that sank near Formerum.

Museums and monuments 
West Terschelling has 110 rijksmonuments. 

There is a museum about the last voyage of Willem Barentsz, 't Behouden Huys.

Gallery

Sources
Municipality guide Terschelling 2005-2006

References

Populated places in Friesland
Terschelling